Gymnocypris eckloni is a species of cyprinid fish endemic to China.

Named in honor of F. L. Ecklon, one of Nikolai Przhevalsky’s assistants during his second trip to Tibet, whose services Przhevalsky said were “invaluable”.

References 

eckloni
Taxa named by Solomon Herzenstein
Fish described in 1891